Dettmann is a surname. People with the name include:

 Julius Dettmann (1894–1945), German SS officer
 Henrik Dettmann (born 1958), Finnish basketball coach
 Ludwig Dettmann (1865–1944), German painter
 Marcel Dettmann (born 1977), German musical artist

German-language surnames